Chinju National University of Education is one of several national universities of education in South Korea.  It provides training to many planning on careers in the country's public education system.  The campus is located in Jinju City, South Gyeongsang province.  The current president is Jung Bojoo (정보주).

Academics
At the undergraduate level, the course of study is divided between general academics and study specific to teaching.  The academic departments cover most of the recognized specializations of public-school teaching, namely:  Computer Education, English Education, Elementary Education, Practical Arts Education, Fine Arts Education, Music Education, Physical Education, Science Education, Mathematics Education, Social Studies Education, Korean Education, and Ethics Education.

History
The school opened as Jinju Public Normal School (관립진주사범학교) in 1940.  It was reorganized as a national college of education, with a two-year course of study, in 1963.  The program was extended to four years in length in 1983.  It became a university of education in 1993.  The graduate school opened three years later.

See also
List of national universities in South Korea
List of universities and colleges in South Korea
Education in Korea

External links
Official school website, in Korean
Official school website, in English

Universities and colleges in South Gyeongsang Province
National universities of education in South Korea
Jinju
Educational institutions established in 1940
1940 establishments in Korea